Grupo Senda is a leading provider of bus transportation services in Mexico, mainly serving the northeastern and central regions of Mexico as well as the states of Alabama, Arkansas, Georgia, Illinois, Louisiana, Michigan,  Mississippi, North Carolina, South Carolina, Tennessee, Texas, Oklahoma, and Missouri in the United States. The company offers scheduled bus passenger service to more than 300 main routes and more than 1,000 destinations throughout 13 states in Mexico and 30 destinations in the United States with an average of 2,400 daily departures and a fleet of over 1,400 buses. It also offers contracted intra-city service to transport personnel and students to industrial and educational facilities with a fleet of over 1,100 buses. The Company maximizes the use of its fleet by offering packaging delivery services through using excess storage capacity on its passenger bus routes, terminals and sales infrastructure and, at the same time, by offering charter services, in which people may contract buses for special occasions, trips and/or corporate events.

The corporation was founded in Linares, N.L., MEX, by the Rodriguez family, and has been passed down through generations. The headquarters are currently located in Monterrey.

Bus Lines

National service

 Senda Ejecutiva (Servicio Ejecutivo)
 Del Norte (Servicio Primera Clase)
 Coahuilenses (Servicio Económico)
 Tamaulipas (Servicio Económico) (Discontinued service)
 Sendor (Servicio Económico) (Discontinued service)

International service

 Turimex Internacional

Services
Domestic passenger bus transportation services (scheduled and chartered)
Cross-border bus transportation services
Industrial personnel and education transportation services (contracted and chartered)
Package delivery services

Key statistics
More than 700 sales offices
Total Passengers Transported: 57 million per year
Total Fleet: 820,020 buses
Average Fleet Life: 5.1 years
Total Employees: 7,500
Emilio Rodriguez is the owner.

External links
Official site

Bus companies of Mexico